Maurice "Mucki" Banach (9 October 1967 – 17 November 1991) was a German professional footballer who played as a forward.

Career
Born in Münster, Banach was the son of a German seaman and an American GI. During his youth career he played for SC Preußen Münster, but he later transferred to the youth team of Borussia Dortmund, until, at seventeen, he signed his first professional contract. Until 1988 he played 14 games for Borussia, scoring two goals.

In the summer of 1988, Banach transferred to the second tier team SG Wattenscheid 09. In 1990, he was the highest scorer in the league – with 22 goals. This attracted attention from 1. FC Köln, to whom he moved in the summer of 1990, playing until the end of 1991. His last two of overall 26 Bundesliga goals came in a 4–1 victory against Fortuna Düsseldorf on 9 November 1991.

One week later, he played in his final game against Schalke 04, which his team lost 3–0.

Death
The morning after this match Banach was killed in a car crash on the Autobahn near Remscheid.
In the struggles after his death, the team, family and friends were supported by the "FC pastor" Heinz Baumann, who also held the funeral service.

Honors
1. FC Köln
 DFB-Pokal: runner-up 1990–91

References

External links
 

1967 births
1991 deaths
Sportspeople from Münster
German footballers
German people of American descent
Germany under-21 international footballers
Association football forwards
Borussia Dortmund players
Borussia Dortmund II players
SG Wattenscheid 09 players
1. FC Köln players
Bundesliga players
2. Bundesliga players
Road incident deaths in Germany
Footballers from North Rhine-Westphalia
West German footballers